Candidula syrensis is a species of air-breathing land snail, a terrestrial pulmonate gastropod mollusk in the family Geomitridae, the hairy snails and their allies.

Distribution

This species occurs in Greece.

References

 Bank, R. A.; Neubert, E. (2017). Checklist of the land and freshwater Gastropoda of Europe. Last update: July 16th, 2017

External links
 Pfeiffer, L. (1846). Symbolae ad historiam Heliceorum. Sectio tertia. 1–100. Cassellis: Th. Fischer

syrensis
Gastropods described in 1846